Maria Goretti (1890–1902) is an Italian virgin-martyr of the Catholic Church.

Maria Goretti may also refer to:

Maria Goretti (film), a 2003 Italian television movie based on the life of the saint
Maria Goretti (actress), Indian MTV VJ and actress
Maria Goretti, a 1953 radiophonic opera by Marcel Delannoy
Santa Maria Goretti, Rio Grande do Sul, a neighbourhood in Porto Alegre, Rio Grande do Sul, Brazil
Santa Maria Goretti, Rome, a church in Rome

See also
Colegio Santa María Goretti, Rancagua, Cachapoal Province, Chile
St. Maria Goretti High School, Hagerstown, Maryland, U.S.
Saints John Neumann and Maria Goretti Catholic High School, Philadelphia, Pennsylvania, U.S.
Saint Maria Goretti High School (Pennsylvania), a former all-female school later merged into the above school
Stadio Santa Maria Goretti, a multi-use stadium in Catania, Italy